The 1912 United States presidential election in New York took place on November 5, 1912. All contemporary 48 states were part of the 1912 United States presidential election. Voters chose 45 electors to the Electoral College, which selected the president and vice president.

New York was won by the Democratic nominees, New Jersey Governor Woodrow Wilson and his running mate, Indiana Governor Thomas R. Marshall. Opposing him were the Republican nominees, incumbent President William Howard Taft and Vice President James S. Sherman, and the Progressive Party candidates, former President Theodore Roosevelt and his running mate California Governor Hiram Johnson. Also in the running was the Socialist Party candidate, Eugene V. Debs, who ran with Emil Seidel.

Wilson won New York with a plurality of 41.27% of the vote, Taft came in second, with 28.68%, and Roosevelt came in third, with 24.56%. Wilson's margin over Taft was thus 12.60%, whilst Debs came in fourth, with 3.99%. In terms of margin, New York was about 2% more Republican than the nation. Wilson's vote margin of victory over Taft in the state was by 200,086 votes.

New York during the Fourth Party System was usually a Republican state in presidential elections. However the strong third party run by former Republican President Theodore Roosevelt as the Bull Moose Party candidate against the incumbent Republican President William Howard Taft split the Republican vote, enabling Woodrow Wilson as the Democratic candidate to win New York State's electoral votes in 1912 with a plurality of only 41% of the vote. Were Taft and Roosevelt voters united behind a single Republican candidate, they would have taken a combined majority of over 53% of the vote. This was the only presidential election during the Fourth Party System that New York voted for a Democratic presidential candidate.

Prior to 1912, New York had not given its electoral votes to a Democratic presidential candidate since Grover Cleveland in 1892. Wilson would lose New York State four years later in the midst of his re-election against Charles Evans Hughes in 1916, and the state would not vote Democratic again until 1932.

Although Theodore Roosevelt finished strong for a third-party candidate with 24.56% of the vote, New York was not amongst his strongest states. New York’s Republican Party organisation and traditional Republican voters proved to be mostly loyal to President Taft as the official Republican nominee. While Roosevelt came in second place nationally ahead of Taft, Taft beat Roosevelt in New York state and finished second in the state behind Wilson. While Taft won the most counties in New York state, 32 compared to Wilson's 29, Roosevelt failed to win a single county in New York state. As a result, Roosevelt was the last candidate to claim an electoral vote in a presidential election without winning any county in his home state until Mitt Romney 100 years later. Debs performed best in upstate Schenectady County, where he broke 20% of the vote, and it was the only county in the state where Debs finished third, ahead of Roosevelt. In the more sparsely populated rural counties of Upstate New York, Debs tended to be beaten down into fifth place by Prohibition candidate Chafin. While Debs got 3.99% of New York state's vote compared to Chafin's 1.22%, Debs finished below Chafin in 34 of the state's 61 counties.

Wilson won many counties in New York which have been Republican bastions for most of history. However, aside from Schoharie County, every upstate county won by Wilson was won with a plurality of less than fifty percent of the vote and some with less than forty percent. Wilson won pluralities in several suburban counties surrounding New York City and in Long Island, as well as several in upstate New York, that would not vote Democratic again until Lyndon B. Johnson swept the state in the 1964 Democratic landslide: Johnson alone has since won Putnam and Steuben Counties.

Despite Wilson’s relatively strong showing on the county map, upstate New York nevertheless remained one of the most loyally Republican regions in the nation in the 1912 election, and the majority of counties in the region still favored Taft. Taft’s most significant wins in the state were his victories in Albany County, home to the state capital of Albany, and Onondaga County, home to the city of Syracuse, while most of his victories came from the many rural counties upstate.

Results

Results by county

See also
 United States presidential elections in New York
 Presidency of William Howard Taft
 Presidency of Woodrow Wilson

Notes

References

New York
1912
1912 New York (state) elections